The Magela hardyhead (Craterocephalus marianae) or Mariana's Hardyhead, is a species of fish in the family Atherinidae endemic to Australia.  It has a very restricted distribution, only found in the Alligator Rivers region of the Northern Territory where it inhabits shallow and fast-flowing freshwater creeks.  The fish has a high thermal tolerance, like some other species in the genus Craterocephalus, and may tolerate water temperatures up to 39.5º. The specific name honours Walter Ivantsoff's daughter, Marian.

References

Magela hardyhead
Freshwater fish of the Northern Territory
Magela hardyhead
Taxonomy articles created by Polbot